Raja Rash Bihari Lal Mandal (1866-1918) was a zamindar, philanthropist and a leader of Indian Independence Movement. He wrote a book named 'Bharat Mata Ka Sandesh' during Bang Bhang movement.

Biography
Rash Bihari Lal was born in 1866 as the only son of Raghubar Dayal Mandal, a Yadav (Ahir) Zamindar of Murho Estate. He was only a few years old when his parents died. After which he was brought up by his maternal grandmother in Ranipatti.

Rash Bihari Babu studied till 11th standard and had knowledge of Hindi, Urdu, Maithili, Sanskrit, Persian, English and French languages. At young age, he took control of the zamindari estate of Murho.

Rash Bihari Lal Mandal is one of the founding members of Congress in Bihar and He had been an elected member of the Bihar Provincial Congress Committee and the All India Congress Committee from 1908 to 1918. He was one of the delegates of Bihar to the 25th Session of Indian National Congress at Allahabad in 1910.

Rashbihari Lal was one of the few zamindar of Bihar to launch an attack on British. He participated in many agitations against the British, due to which more than 120 cases were filed against him by the British. Despite being anti-British, In 1911, Rash Bihari Lal Mandal was given a prestigious place in the Delhi Durbar of Emperor George V's coronation in India.

In 1911, Rashbihari Lal founded the Gop Jatiya Mahasabha. Later, the All-India Yadav Mahasabha was formed by merging the Gop Jatiye Mahasabha and Ahir Kshatriya Mahasabha.

Babu Rash Bihari Lal died of illness on 26 August 1918 in Banaras, at the age of 52.

References

1866 births
1918 deaths
Zamindars of Madhepura
History of Bihar
Mithila
People from Bihar